The 1901 Kansas State Aggies football team was an American football team that represented Kansas State Agricultural College—now known as Kansas State University—as an independent during the 1901 college football season. In their first season under head coach Wade Moore, the Aggies compiled a 3–4–1 record. The team played home games at Athletic Park in Manhattan, Kansas.

Schedule

References

Kansas State
Kansas State Wildcats football seasons
Kansas State Aggies football